Lane Jay Twitchell (born 1967) is a mixed media artist of visionary images. His intricately patterned abstract and semi-representational mixed media works are unmistakable. Twitchell mainly works in paint media, paper cutting, and collage. Cherie K. Woodworth wrote, “What Twitchell does is reinterpret the Western landscape— landscape as kaleidoscope, as a quilt made of paper, as a wide open world refracted in a giant, man-made snowflake. It is the landscape and the heart of the West—its natural grandeur, its history, its modern-day suburbs. Twitchell’s landscape is a labyrinthine desert rose blossoming in the midst of Manhattan.”

Biography 
Lane Jay Twitchell was born on November 17, 1967 in Murray, UT. He was raised in the cities of Ogden and Salt Lake City, UT as a member of the Church of Jesus Christ of Latter-day Saints (LDS Church). He attended the University of Utah on a special departmental scholarship in 1986, and graduated with his BFA in 1993. He then went on to the School of Visual Arts in New York City, where he graduated with his MFA in 1995. He currently lives and works in Brooklyn, New York, and also works as a professor at the School of Visual Arts in New York City.

Twitchell uses paper craft to create visually interesting, kaleidoscope patterns inspired by American middle-class consumerism, urban and suburban landscapes and architecture, and, as he puts it, “American Religious Expansionism,” stemming from his faith journey in and out of the LDS Church. Once in New York City, he recognized the novelty his Mormon upbringing would represent to the New York art scene, and began to establish a voice within the downtown art community.

Career 
Twitchell was recognized early in his career with a solo exhibition at New York's legendary gallery, Deitch Projects (1999). Twitchell has received positive reviews in well-known publications including The New York Times, The New York Observer, The Washington Post, and Art in America. In 1998, Lane Twitchell was the recipient of a Rema Hort Mann Foundation grant. He is also a two-time winner of a New York Foundation for the Arts fellowship in Drawing (1999) and Craft (2003). In 1998, he participated in the Museum of Modern Art's (MoMA) P.S. 1 National Studio Program. He completed his artist residency at Wier Farm Trust in Wilton, CT. He has completed two major New York City public art commissions, and two national commissions with the Chicago Public Art Program and the Department of Cultural Affairs Percent Art Program. His work is held in depth at The Goetz Collection in Munich, Germany, as well as The Museum of Modern Art, significant private collections internationally, the Springville Museum of Art (Springville, UT), and The Church Museum of History and Art (Salt Lake City, UT). View his process and work on Instagram @lanetwitchell.

Works 
Art Bank Program, Washington D.C
The Goetz Collection, Munich, Germany
The Progressive Corporation, Mayfield, OH
Neuberger Berman Collection, New York City, New York
Day Zoo, U.S. Department of State Embassy 
Leap With Me, Roebling Hall, New York, New York 
A-Frame (Green), MoMA, New York, New York (1998)
Gas-n-Go (Red), MoMA, New York, New York (1998)

Exhibitions 
#inversion: Lane Twitchell, Writ & Vision, Provo, UT (2017)
 Roebling Hall, New York, NY (2008)
 Revelation: Lane Twitchell Drawing & Painting, Schweinfurth Memorial Art Center, Auburn, New York; University Art Museum, SUNY Albany, New York; Gibson Gallery, SUNY Potsdam, New York. Curated by Thomas Piche (2007)
The Searchers, Whitebox, New York, New York. Curated by Patrica Maloney (2006)
Redefined: Modern and Contemporary Art from the Collection, Corcoran Gallery of Art, Washington D.C. Curated by Johnathan Binstock. (2006)
Drawings III (selected), G-Module, Paris, France (2006)
Small painting show, The Ulrich Museum, Wichita, Kansas. Organized by the General Store, Milwaukee (2006)
Loveless (the shoegazer show), New York, New York (2006)
I Love the Burbs, Katonah Museum of Art, Katonah, New York. Curated by Eileen Keiter (2006)
The Early Show, White Columns, New York, New York. Organized by the General Store, Milwaukee (2005)
One of a Kind, New York Academy of Sciences, New York, New York. Curated by Thomas Woodruff (2005)
Group Loop, G Fine Art, Washington D.C. Curated by Christoph Cox (2005)
Here & There, Greenberg Van Doren Gallery, New York, New York (2005)
American Paradigms: David Opdyke and Lane Twitchell, Corcoran Gallery of Art, Washington, D.C. (2004)
Foursquare, G Fine Arts, Washington D.C. (2004)
Beginning Here: 101 Ways, Visual Arts Gallery, School of Visual Arts, New York, New York. Organized by Jerry Saltz (2004)
Emerging 2003: ACRIA Benefit, Matthew Marks Gallery, New York, New York (2003)
Perforations, McKenzie Fine Art, New York, New York (2003)
Terrible Beauty, Satellite, a division of Roebling Hall, New York, New York (2003)
The Nature of the Beast, Caren Golden Gallery, New York, New York (2002)
Some Assemblage Required: Collage Culture in Post-War America, Everson Museum of Art, Syracuse, New York; Madison Art Center, Madison, WI; Polk Museum of Art, Lakeland, FL. Curated by Thomas Piche (2002)
Snapshot, Elizabeth Leach Gallery, Portland, Oregon (2002)
Print Publisher's Spotlight: Solo Impression, Barbara Krakow Gallery, Boston, Massachusetts (2002)
Past Tense: a contemporary dialogue, The Museum of Art, Brigham Young University, Provo, Utah (2002)
The Order of Things, Teachers Insurance and Annuity Association College Retirement Equities Fund, New York, New York (2002)
The Norman Dubrow Biennial, Kagan Martos Gallery, New York, New York (2002)
On Architectural Atmosphere, G Fine Art, Washington, D.C. Curated by Christoph Cox (2002)
Private Property, Artemis Greenberg Van Doren Gallery, New York, New York (2002)
It's a Party and We're Having a Great Time, Paul Morris Gallery, New York, New York (2001)
New Prints 2001 - Winter, International Print Center, New York, New York (2001)
Good Business is the Best Art: 20 Years in the Artist Marketplace Program, Bronx Museum of Art, New York, New York. Curated by Lydia Yee (2000)
Faith-The Impact of Judeo-Christian Religion on Art at the Millennium, Aldrich Museum of Contemporary Art, Ridgefield, Connecticut. Curated by Christian Eckart, Harry Philbrick, and Osvaldo Romberg (2000)
Annual Benefit, Foundation for Contemporary Performance Arts, Matthew Marks Gallery, New York, New York (2000)
1999, P.S.1 Contemporary Art Center, Long Island City, New York. Curated by Tony Gurrero (1999)
Cut Paper - Contemporary and Traditional, Elsa Mott Ives Gallery, New York, New York (1999)
State of the Union. Deitch Projects, New York, New York (1999)

References

Further reading 
 Clements, Derrick (2017). "New Provo Exhibit Reveals, Obscures biography of Artist" Provo Daily Herald
 Christensen, Ruth (2017). "A Refreshing Inversion" Artists of Utah  
 Cotter, Holland; Rosenberg, Karen (2008). "ART IN REVIEW" The New York Times
 
 Grundberg, Andy (2005) "'Loop': What Goes Around..." Washington Post
 
 Evenson, Brian (2004). "In Conversation: Lane Twitchell" Brooklyn Rail
 Dawson, Jessica (2004). "Man on a Mission: The Early Lane Twitchell" Washington Post
 Glueck, Grace (2002). "Art In Review; Lane Twitchell -- 'Private Property'" The New York Times
 Woodworth, Cherie K. "Landscape and the American West: The Sacred, the Sublime, and the Suburbs--The Art of Lane Twitchell." Sunstone, October 2002: 34–39.
 Van Doren Waxter (2002). "Lane Twitchell" Press Release; Van Doren Waxter Gallery
 Kuang, Cliff (2009). "Everything but the paper cut: Eye-popping ways artists use paper." Fast Company blog, 20 October 2009.

1967 births
Living people
American contemporary artists
Artists from New York (state)
Artists from Salt Lake City
American Latter Day Saints